Corynura is a genus of bees belonging to the family Halictidae.

The species of this genus are found in Southern America.

Species:

Corynura ampliata 
Corynura analis 
Corynura apicata 
Corynura atrovirens 
Corynura aureoviridis
Corynura bruchiana 
Corynura callicladura 
Corynura chilensis 
Corynura chiloeensis 
Corynura chloris 
Corynura chloromelas 
Corynura corinogaster 
Corynura cristata 
Corynura herbsti 
Corynura heterochlora 
Corynura lepida 
Corynura melanoclada 
Corynura moscosensis
Corynura patagonica 
Corynura prothysteres 
Corynura rubella 
Corynura spadicidiventris

References

Halictidae